is a song by Japanese boy band Arashi from their debut studio album Arashi No.1 Ichigou: Arashi wa Arashi o Yobu! (2001). It was released on November 8, 2000 by Pony Canyon as their fourth single. The single was released in two editions. While both the regular edition and limited edition contains two songs and its instrumentals, the two have different covers and only the limited edition included a set of stickers.

"Kansha Kangeki Ame Arashi" debuted at number two on the Oricon Singles Chart, and was certified Platinum by the Recording Industry Association of Japan for shipment of 400,000 copies.

Single information
"Kansha Kangeki Ame Arashi" was used as the theme song for the drama Namida o Fuite starring Yōsuke Eguchi, Arashi member Kazunari Ninomiya, Yuki Uchida and Aya Ueto.

"Kansha Kangeki Ame Arashi" means "to be very grateful". The comes from the phrase , which is a play on the war time phrase .

Track listing
All tracks arranged by Chokkaku.

Charts

Weekly charts

Certifications

References

External links
 Product information 
 Oricon profile 

Arashi songs
2000 singles
2000 songs
Pony Canyon singles
Japanese television drama theme songs
Songs written by Kōji Makaino